John George Stone (27 July 1894–1940) was an English footballer who played in the Football League for Chelsea.

References

1894 births
1940 deaths
English footballers
Association football forwards
English Football League players
Hemel Hempstead Town F.C. players
Chelsea F.C. players
Watford F.C. players